The 1955 Oregon State Beavers football team represented Oregon State University in the Pacific Coast Conference (PCC) during the 1955 college football season.  In their first season under head coach Tommy Prothro, the Beavers compiled a 6–3 record (5–2 in PCC, second), and outscored their opponents 126 to 120. They played three home games on campus at Parker Stadium in Corvallis and one at Multnomah Stadium in Portland.

Hired in February at age 34, Prothro had been an assistant under Red Sanders for nine seasons; at UCLA (1949–54) and Vanderbilt (1946–48).

Schedule

References

Oregon State
Oregon State Beavers football seasons
Oregon State Beavers football